Seven Sisters RFC (Welsh:Clwb Rygbi Blaendulais) is a rugby union club representing the village of Seven Sisters, Wales, playing in the WRU Division 2 west central league. The club are members of the Welsh Rugby Union and is a feeder club for the Ospreys.

History
Seven Sisters RFC formed in 1897, in the industrialised South Wales coalfield.

During The 1950s and 1960s, when touring teams came to play Seven Sisters they would often be given a tour of the colliery prior to playing a match. It was reputedly common practice that when they were lowered down the shaft, the winding man would deliberately allow the cage to drop like a stone before applying the brake at the last moment. Few touring teams won their matches.

Seven Sisters RFC were relegated in the 2006-07 season from Division Two West into Division Three South West of the Welsh National Leagues. Seven had a mediocre year after their relegation from Division 2 finishing the year in 6th position. The following Season they narrowly avoided being relegated after a dramatic losing bonus point defeat in the last game of the Season saved them and kept them in Division 3. This was the season when coaches Jeff 'Jako' Davies, Geraint Ellis took over, Julian Hopkins was appointed the Backs Coach a Season later.

Seven Sisters RFC have gone from strength to strength following their near relegation in the 2008-2009 season. In the years seasons since then they have finished consistently higher up the league every year. They finished 5th in the 2009-2010, and then 3rd in the 2010-2011 Season.

The 2011-2012 season has again been a more successful season than the previous with Seven finishing 2nd in the league and winning promotion to division 2 for the 2012/2013. They also finished runners up in the West Wales Bowl Competition narrowly losing out 27-26 to Tumble in the Final.

Club honours

Club records
 Most Points - Tommy James 1591 pts
 Most Points In A Season - Alun Davies (1983–84) 320 pts
 Most Tries - Ian Watts 156 Tries
 Most Appearances - Brian Howell 680

See also
 Rugby union in Wales

References

External links
 
 Welsh Rugby Union home page

Rugby clubs established in 1897
Seven sisters
Rugby union in Neath Port Talbot